Showdown is a 1963 American Western film directed by R. G. Springsteen and starring Audie Murphy, Kathleen Crowley and Charles Drake. It was originally known as The Iron Collar.

Plot
Two cowboys, Chris Foster and Bert Pickett, go into town to cash their paychecks. Bert gets in a fight after getting drunk and involves Chris. Bert and Chris are put in iron collars, chained to a killer, LaValle. They manage to escape with La Valle's gang, though still wearing their iron collars. During the course of the escape, Bert picks up some negotiable bonds which he hopes to cash once he and Chris escape from LaValle. But LaValle discovers that Bert is holding the bonds. Since no one in his gang can cash them, he holds Chris and demands that Bert go into the nearest town to cash them and bring back the money, or Chris will be killed.

Cast
 Audie Murphy as Chris Foster
 Kathleen Crowley as Estelle
 Charles Drake as Bert Pickett
 Harold J. Stone as LaValle
 Skip Homeier as Caslon
 L. Q. Jones as Foray
 Strother Martin as Charlie Reeder
 John McKee as Marshal Beaudine
 Henry Wills as Chaca
 Joe Haworth as Guard
 Kevin Brodie as Buster
 Carol Thurston as Smithy's wife
 Dabbs Greer as Express Man

Production
Showdown was shot in black and white to save money, which infuriated Murphy. Producer Gordon Kay said that the film earned no less than did other Murphy films of the period.

See also
List of American films of 1963

References

External links
 
 
 

1963 Western (genre) films
1963 films
Audie Murphy
American Western (genre) films
Films scored by Hans J. Salter
1960s English-language films
1960s American films